Calvin O. Thomas (July 1, 1915 – April 14, 1982) was an American football player. 

A native of Waldron, Arkansas, Thomas attended Pawhuska High School in Oklahoma and then played college football at the University of Tulsa.

He also played professional football in the National Football League (NFL) as a guard for the Detroit Lions. He appeared in 13 games for the Lions during the 1939 and 1940 seasons.

References

1915 births
1982 deaths
American football guards
Tulsa Golden Hurricane football players
Detroit Lions players
Players of American football from Arkansas